EveryDoctor is a British grassroots advocacy group made up of doctors. The group was established in 2019, and grew during the COVID-19 pandemic in the United Kingdom. In May 2021, EveryDoctor and the Good Law Project brought legal action against the British government in relation to COVID-19 PPE contracts during the first wave of the COVID-19 pandemic, accusing the Department of Health and Social Care of unlawful procurement procedures and providing inadequate PPE supplies.

It sells a range of products including face masks with sales helping to fund their work. Profits are "retained" by EveryDoctor, which operates as a Limited company. In 2021 alone, they "retained" a profit of over £123,000 to December 2021, and paid out salaries to its small leadership team of over £163,000  - this is despite the business being promoted as a "non-profit"

See also 
 COVID-19 contracts in the United Kingdom

References

External links 
 EveryDoctor website

COVID-19 pandemic in the United Kingdom
National Health Service
2019 establishments in the United Kingdom
Medical activism
Health advocacy groups
Political organisations based in the United Kingdom